All visitors to Equatorial Guinea, unless they come from one of the visa exempt countries mentioned below, must obtain a visa from one of the Equatorial Guinea diplomatic missions prior to arrival.

Visa policy map

Visa exemption 

2021-04-27 Only USA citizens are exempted.

CItizens of the following 9 countries can visit Equatorial Guinea without a visa:

1 – does not apply to emergency passports

Citizens of other countries require a visa for all purposes including transit.

Also, holders of diplomatic, official or service passports issued to nationals of Brazil, China, Cuba, Morocco and United Arab Emirates do not require a visa for Equatorial Guinea. Visa exemption agreement for holders of diplomatic and service passports was signed with Indonesia in August 2019 and it is yet to come into force.
 and  signed an agreement of abolishing visas for diplomatic and service passports on 10 February 2022.

Visa on arrival
Citizens of  holding normal passports may obtain a visa on arrival.

eVisa
https://sauat-app.vfsevisa.com/gnq/en/login

See also
 Visa requirements for Equatorial Guinean citizens

References

External links

Equatorial Guinea
Foreign relations of Equatorial Guinea